The Core Cities Health Improvement Collaborative is a network established to improve public health in England’s eight biggest regional cities: Birmingham, Bristol, Leeds, Liverpool, Manchester, Newcastle upon Tyne, Nottingham and Sheffield.
Built upon the existing English Core Cities Group of local authorities, which was established in 1995 to boost the regional economic performance of England’s eight biggest cities outside London, the Health Improvement Collaborative has been established to apply the same spirit of collaboration to tackle health inequalities in those areas.
Established in 2008 by the chief executives of the ten primary care trusts in those eight cities (Birmingham is represented by three trusts), the aim of the collaborative is to engage all parties involved in tackling health inequalities and improving public health.

Part-funded by the Department of Health, the group will spend its first two years focusing on tackling six major health inequalities:

 Alcohol harm
 All-age, all-cause early mortality
 Obesity
 Mental health and well-being
 Smoking
 Teenage pregnancy

In each case, the primary aim of the Core Cities Health Improvement Collaborative is to promote closer collaboration between the cities and their other stakeholders – such as local authorities, other public sector agencies, voluntary sector organisations and user groups.

Six learning events are being organised to act as a catalyst for further collaborative working on each topic, while a powerful online knowledge management system ensures all stakeholders can quickly and easily identify and share their experience and materials with each other.
To assist with this process, a consortium of private sector partners has been appointed to facilitate the programme. Managed by Finnamore, the consortium also includes partners from Dr Foster Intelligence, VISTA and SOLACE Enterprises.

Useful links
 South Birmingham PCT website
 Birmingham East and North PCT website
 Heart of Birmingham PCT website
 NHS Bristol website
 NHS Leeds website
 Liverpool Primary Care Trust website
 NHS Manchester website
 NHS Newcastle website
 NHS Nottingham City website
 NHS Sheffield website
 Finnamore website
 Dr Foster Intelligence website
 Vista website
 SOLACE Enterprises website

References

Public health organizations
National Health Service (England)